This is a list of some of the records relating to home runs hit in baseball games played in the Major Leagues. Some Major League records are sufficiently notable to have their own page, for example the single-season home run record, the progression of the lifetime home run record, and the members of the 500 home run club. A few other records are kept on separate pages, they are listed below.

In the tables below, players and teams denoted in boldface  are still actively contributing to the record noted, while (r) denotes a player's rookie season.

Key

Players and the columns that correspond are denoted in boldface if they are still actively contributing to the record noted.

Career records

Most seasons with 40 home runs

Most consecutive seasons with 40 home runs

Most seasons with 30 home runs

Most consecutive seasons with 30 home runs

Most seasons with 20 home runs

Most consecutive seasons with 20 home runs

Most seasons as league leader in home runs

see note1

Most consecutive seasons as league leader in home runs

see note1

League leader in home runs, both leagues

League leader in home runs, three different teams

Players who have hit at least one home run in 40 stadiums

Most career grand slams

Most career walk-off home runs

Season records

Most home runs by a team in one season

Most grand slams by a player in one season

Game records

Four home runs by an individual in one game

Four consecutive home runs by a team in one game

Two grand slams by one hitter in one game

Three grand slams by a team in one game

Other

Most home runs on a single day (all teams combined)

Most walkoff home runs in a season (all teams combined)

See also
 Home run
 Grand slam
 List of Major League Baseball progressive career home runs leaders
 List of Major League Baseball career home run leaders
 List of Major League Baseball all-time leaders in home runs by pitchers
 List of Major League Baseball single-game grand slam leaders
 500 home run club
 20–20–20 club
 30–30 club
 The Year Babe Ruth Hit 104 Home Runs

Notes
 Mark McGwire led the American League in home runs in 1987 and 1996. He led the National League in 1998 and 1999. In 1997, he led Major League Baseball in home runs, but led neither the American nor National League, as his season was split between the Oakland Athletics and St. Louis Cardinals. If that season were to be included, he would be the league leader for five seasons, four of which were in succession.
 Delahanty and Horner are the only players to hit four home runs in a game as a part of a losing effort.
 Game 2 of a doubleheader.
 Tony Cloninger is unique on this list as the only pitcher.
 Fernando Tatís is the only player to hit his two grand slams in the same inning. in the third inning off Chan Ho Park; it was also the Major League record for RBIs by a player in one inning (8).
 Nomar Garciaparra is the only player to do so at home.
 Bill Mueller is the only player to hit a grand slam from each side of the plate.

References

Major League Baseball records
Major League Baseball lists